The Den Uyl cabinet was the executive branch of the Dutch Government from 11 May 1973 until 19 December 1977. The cabinet was formed by the social-democratic Labour Party (PvdA), the christian-democratic Catholic People's Party (KVP) and Anti-Revolutionary Party (ARP), the progressive Political Party of Radicals (PPR) and the social-liberal Democrats 66 (D'66) after the election of 1972. The cabinet was a left-wing grand coalition and had a substantial majority in the House of Representatives with Labour Leader Joop den Uyl serving as Prime Minister. Prominent Catholic politician Dries van Agt, the Minister of Justice from the previous cabinet, served as Deputy Prime Minister until his resignation. Prominent Protestant politician Gaius de Gaay Fortman the Minister of the Interior assumed the office of Deputy Prime Minister on 8 September 1977.

The cabinet served during the tumultuous 1970s and had to deal with several major crises such as the 1973 oil crisis, the Lockheed scandal, the Moluccans incidents and the fallout of the Yom Kippur War. Internally the cabinet suffered several conflicts, including the poor working relationship between Prime Minister Den Uyl and Deputy Prime Minister Van Agt, and multiple resignations. The cabinet fell on 22 March 1977, just before the end of its term, following a major political crisis, and continued in a demissionary capacity until it was replaced following the election of 1977.

Formation
After the 1972 election the Labour Party (PvdA) of Joop den Uyl was the winner of the election, winning four new seats and having now a total of 43 seats. Prior to the election the PvdA had formed a political alliance with the progressive Christian Political Party of Radicals and the social-liberal Democrats 66, but this alliance failed to achieve a majority in the House of Representatives. After lengthy negotiations the Christian-democratic Catholic People's Party (KVP) and Anti-Revolutionary Party (ARP) agreed to start talks about joining the coalition. During the formation negotiations between the parties were difficult because of disputes between uncompromising left-wing radicals and the moderate factions of the left-wing parties and the left-wing Christians. In the end both the KVP and the ARP joined the cabinet.

Term
The Den Uyl cabinet was confronted with many problems, starting with the 1973 oil crisis following Dutch support of Israel in the Yom Kippur War. Prime Minister Joop den Uyl said in a speech on national television that "things would never return to the way they were" and implemented fuel rationing and a ban on Sunday driving.

Domestically the cabinet had several major conflicts, including the terrorist attacks by Moluccans seeking independence from Indonesia, the Lockheed affair (bribes accepted by the queen's husband) and the closing of the abortion clinic Bloemenhove. Many plans could not be implemented because of these problems.

The cabinet fell because of a disagreement over land development plans. A deeper cause was the left-wing distrust of the Christian ministers, especially in the case of war criminal Pieter Menten, where Deputy Prime Minister and Minister of Justice Dries van Agt was ridiculed (so believed Van Agt) by some party members of Prime Minister Joop den Uyl.

Changes
On 1 November 1973, Minister of Agriculture and Fisheries Tiemen Brouwer (KVP) resigned for reasons of health; shortly after he took office, he suffered a brain haemorrhage. That same day State Secretary for Finance Fons van der Stee (KVP) was installed as Minister of Agriculture and Fisheries. On 21 December 1973, Martin van Rooijen (KVP), who until then had been working as the head of the fiscal tax department for Royal Dutch Shell, was appointed as State Secretary for Finance.

On 1 March 1974, State Secretary for Defence Joep Mommersteeg (KVP) resigned because of health problems. On 11 March 1974, brigadier general Cees van Lent (KVP), who until then had been working as Chief of the Personnel Department of the Royal Netherlands Army, was installed as his successor.

On 27 May 1975, State Secretary for Justice Jan Glastra van Loon (D'66) resigned due to a conflict with top officials at the Ministry of Defence after criticizing the department's leadership in an interview. On 6 June 1975, former Utrecht Alderman Henk Zeevalking (D'66) was appointed his successor.

On 1 September 1975, State Secretary for Education and Sciences Antoon Veerman (ARP) resigned because of health reasons. That same day, Klaas de Jong (ARP), who until then had been working as rector of the Christian school in Amersfoort, was installed as his successor.

On 1 January 1977, Minister of Defence Henk Vredeling (PvdA) resigned after he was appointed as European Commissioner for Employment and Social Affairs. That same day, State Secretary for Defence Bram Stemerdink (PvdA) was appointed as his successor.

On 1 May 1977, State Secretary for the Interior Wim Polak (PvdA) resigned after he was appointed Mayor of Amsterdam; because the cabinet was already demissionary he was not replaced.

On 8 September 1977, Deputy Prime Minister and Minister of Justice Dries van Agt (KVP) resigned because of the dualism of the constitutional convention in the States General of the Netherlands after he was elected as a Member of the House of Representatives. Minister of the Interior Gaius de Gaay Fortman (ARP) took over both positions until the new cabinet was installed on 19 December 1977.

For the same reason, on 8 September 1977 State Secretary for Foreign Affairs Laurens Jan Brinkhorst (D'66), State Secretary for Justice Henk Zeevalking (D'66), State Secretary for Economic Affairs Ted Hazekamp (KVP), State Secretary for Education and Sciences Ger Klein (PvdA), State Secretaries for Housing and Spatial Planning Jan Schaefer (PvdA) and Marcel van Dam (PvdA) and State Secretary for Culture, Recreation and Social Work Wim Meijer (PvdA) also resigned.

Cabinet members

See also
 Den Uyl Shadow Cabinet

References

External links
Official

  Kabinet-Den Uyl Parlement & Politiek
  Kabinet-Den Uyl Rijksoverheid

Cabinets of the Netherlands
1973 establishments in the Netherlands
1977 disestablishments in the Netherlands
Cabinets established in 1973
Cabinets disestablished in 1977